The 1979 Australian Football Championships Night Series was the 1st edition of the AFC Night Series, a VFL-organised national club Australian rules football tournament between the leading clubs from the VFL, the WANFL and State Representative Teams.

In June 1978 the VFL announced their plans to form a new company to oversee a night series that would be broadcast nationally and Australian Football Championships Pty. Ltd. was incorporated on 28 July 1978 to run a rival national night competition, in opposition to the NFL Night Series. By October 1978, The VFL were joined by the WAFL, TANFL, NSWAFL and ACTAFL in the joint venture and transferred from NFL Night Series to the AFC Night Series. However, the SANFL rejected the VFL's overtures, choosing to remain aligned with the NFL instead. They were joined by the VFA and QAFL in a greatly-reduced NFL Series.

Qualified Teams

1 Includes previous appearances in the Championship of Australia and NFL Night Series.

Venues

Knockout stage

Round 1

Round 2

Quarter-finals

Semi-finals

Australian Football Championships Night Series Final

References

Australian rules interstate football
History of Australian rules football
Australian rules football competitions in Australia
1979 in Australian rules football